The 1914–15 season was the 16th season for FC Barcelona.

Events

Immersed in an internal crisis, the club is in the hands of Vice President Peris de Vargas until, on June 29, 1915, Rafael Llopart arrives at the presidency and carries out a renewal of positions. 
Filipino Paulino Alcántara becomes the top scorer for the first time.

Results

External links

webdelcule.com
webdelcule.com

References

FC Barcelona seasons
Barcelona